Mordellistena divisa is a beetle in the genus Mordellistena of the family Mordellidae. It was described in 1859 by John Lawrence LeConte.

References

divisa
Beetles described in 1859